Therese Megerle von Mühlfeld (born Therese Pop(p) von Popenburg: 1813 - 4 July 1865) was an Austrian writer and translator (from French and English) who came to prominence, primarily, as a dramatist.

Life
Therese Pop was born in Pressburg, the daughter of a Hungarian landowner.   She was only 16 when in 1829 she married Georg Johann Wilhelm Megerle von Mühlfeld in Preßburg.  He was a surgeon and dentist.   His bride came to the marriage with 60,000 florins, which was a very substantial dowry.  It enabled Megerle to embark on a change of career.   He abandoned his medical work and took over the city theatre.   Later, in 1850, he took over at the Theater in der Josefstadt on the western side of Vienna.   Partly through a lack of business acumen and partly through bad luck he managed to lose all his (and his wife's) money.  The Josefstadt theatre was well established and apparently busy during the four years he spent there.   Nevertheless, as one commentator observed, he was neither the first nor the last theatre director who came to grief at the Josefstadt.  After becoming bankrupt Megerle died, at which point it is said that he left for his wife nothing but a suit.

In the middle of all this sadness, his widow displayed remarkable energy as she set about building herself a career as a dramatist. A collection of her pieces was published in three volumes in 1844 under the title "Novellen und Erzählungen" ("Novellas and stories"). One critic found it "very entertaining, full of life and action". One of her novels, "Die beiden Graßel" ("The two Grassels"), reached no fewer than five editions, and a stage adaptation of it which she herself wrote then in 1848 ran for eighty evenings without a break. She became progressively more creative and prolific as a dramatist, and also found time to adapt English and French novels along with other frequently colourful sources, producing probably more than fifty lively and effective stage works pieces, though at least one serious commentator believed that her output was devoid of artistic worth. A flavour of her output can be gleaned from the titles of some of the productions of her plays:
  "Ein gebrochenes Wort. Volksstück" (loosely, "A broken promise.  Popular piece"): Theater in der Josefstadt in Vienna, 17 September 1859
  "Die Armen und Elenden, Bilder aus dem französischen Volksleben" (loosely, "The poor and destitute, images from French common life" - based on Les Misérables by Victor Hugo):   in Vienna, 29 May 1863
  "Novara. Bilder aus dem italienischen Feldzuge von 1849" ("Pictures from the Italian campaign of 1849"):   in Vienna, 13 September 1863
  "Maledetta, der Bandit von Frascati. Spectakelschauspiel" (loosely, "Maldetta, the bandit of Frascati.   Spectacular":    in Vienna, 30 September 1863  
  "Nach achtzehn Jahren. Volksstück" ("After eighteen years.  Popular piece"):   Theater in der Josefstadt in Vienna, 8 December 1863
  "Die Regentrude und das Feuerwichtel. Phantastisches Märchen" (loosely, "The Rain Maiden and the Fire Imp.  Fantastical folk tale"):   Theater in der Josefstadt in Vienna, 24 March 1865
Her final piece was called "Die Eselshaut" ("The donkey skin"), a reworking from a French piece, for which authorship was attributed to her son, Julius.

References

Australian women dramatists and playwrights
19th-century Austrian dramatists and playwrights
Writers from Bratislava
1813 births
1865 deaths
19th-century Austrian women writers